The Men's Downhill competition of the Nagano 1998 Olympics was held at Hakuba on Friday, February 13. Originally scheduled for Sunday, the race was postponed several times due to heavy snow, followed by rain and gusty winds.

The reigning world champion was Bruno Kernen of Switzerland, while France's Luc Alphand was the reigning World Cup downhill champion, but had since retired from competition. The defending Olympic champion was Tommy Moe of the United States.

France's Jean-Luc Crétier won the gold medal, Lasse Kjus of Norway took the silver, and the bronze medalist was Hannes Trinkl of Austria; Moe was twelfth and Kernan did not finish. Nine of the first twenty failed to finish, including a crash by favorite Hermann Maier of Austria, which he walked away from. Luca Cattaneo's injury caused a half-hour delay underneath the clear skies, as the temperature at the finish approached . Of the eight with bib numbers 13 through 20, only Moe completed the race; in total, fifteen of the 43 racers did not finish.

It was the sole victory of Crétier's career; he had five World cup podiums, three of which were in the two months preceding the Olympics, at the notable venues of Beaver Creek, Wengen, and Kitzbühel. Entering the Olympics, he was fourth in the season's World Cup downhill standings.

Results
The race was started at 11:00 local time, (UTC +9).

References

External links 
FIS results
Results

Men's downhill
Winter Olympics